Bernardino Lanini or Lanino (c. 1512 – c. 1582) was an Italian painter of the Renaissance period, active mainly in Milan.

Biography
He was born in Mortara near Pavia. He trained as a pupil of the painter Gaudenzio Ferrari. In Milan, he painted a Last Supper for the church San Nazaro Grande. He painted a Holy family for the church of Sant'Ambrogio, now on display in the Brera Gallery. He painted frescoes on the Life of the Magdalen for the church of San Cristoforo in Vercelli. Three of his works are on display at the Museo Borgogna in Vercelli, including an Annunciation; a Madonna and Child with Saints Bernardino of Siena and St Francis of Assisi (also labelled Madonna del cane due to dog asleep below Virgin); and a painted standard of Madonna and Child with St Anne and hooded confraternity brothers, painted for the Confraternita di Sant’Anna. Lanini painted a St Catherine for the church San Celso. He frescoed sibyls for the Novara Cathedral. He also painted for a chapel in the Basilica of San Magno, Legnano. Other paintings are in  Saronno.

References

1511 births
1570s deaths
16th-century Italian painters
Italian male painters
Painters from Milan
Italian Renaissance painters
Fresco painters
Pupils and followers of Leonardo da Vinci